Billericay was a constituency represented in the House of Commons of the Parliament of the United Kingdom. It elected one Member of Parliament (MP) by the first past the post system of election.

It returned Conservative MPs at every election except 1966.

History 
The seat was first created as a county constituency for the 1950 general election under the Representation of the People Act 1948, as a successor to the abolished seat of South East Essex. The First Periodic Review of Westminster constituencies brought in for the 1955 general election resulted in major boundary changes and it was abolished by the Second Review for the February 1974 general election.

It was re-established for the 1983 general election, with further major changes for the 1997 general election, and abolished once again for the 2010 general election.

Boundaries and boundary changes 

1950–1955: The Urban Districts of Billericay, Benfleet, Canvey Island, and Rayleigh.

Formed from the abolished South-Eastern Division of Essex, excluding the Rural District of Rochford.

1955–1974: The Urban Districts of Billericay and Brentwood.

Benfleet, Canvey Island and Rayleigh (together with Rochford) now formed the re-established County Constituency of South East Essex. Billericay was combined with Brentwood, which had previously been included in Romford.

On abolition, the Urban District of Billericay, which had been reconstituted as the Urban District of Basildon, formed the new Borough Constituency of Basildon.  The Urban District of Brentwood formed the basis for the new County Constituency of Brentwood and Ongar.

1983–1997: The District of Basildon wards of Billericay East, Billericay West, Burstead, Laindon, Wickford North, and Wickford South, and the Borough of Thurrock wards of Corringham and Fobbing, Orsett, Stanford-le-Hope, and The Homesteads.

Re-established as a County Constituency, formed from northern parts of the constituency of Basildon, including Billericay and Wickford, together with northern parts of the constituency of Thurrock.

1997–2010: The District of Basildon wards of Billericay East, Billericay West, Burstead, Laindon, Pitsea East, Pitsea West, Wickford North, and Wickford South.

Major realignment of boundaries with Basildon; Pitsea was transferred from Basildon in exchange for the northern part of the Borough of Thurrock.

The seat was abolished once again for the 2010 general election. The majority, comprising Billericay, Burstead and Laindon, was included in the new Borough Constituency of Basildon and Billericay; Pitsea was included in the new County Constituency of South Basildon and East Thurrock; and Wickford was included in the new County Constituency of Rayleigh and Wickford.

Members of Parliament 
Billericay has elected somewhat colourful characters to Westminster, namely Harvey Proctor, the right-wing MP who resigned after homosexual sex charges, and Teresa Gorman, the Maastricht rebel who stood down after accusing the Commons Standards and Privileges committee of sexism over questions surrounding her registered business dealings.

MPs 1950–1974

MPs 1983–2010

Elections

Elections in the 1950s

Elections in the 1960s

Elections in the 1970s

Elections in the 1980s

Elections in the 1990s

Elections in the 2000s

See also 
 List of parliamentary constituencies in Essex
 Billericay
 Laindon

Notes and references 

Parliamentary constituencies in Essex (historic)
Constituencies of the Parliament of the United Kingdom established in 1950
Constituencies of the Parliament of the United Kingdom disestablished in 1974
Constituencies of the Parliament of the United Kingdom established in 1983
Constituencies of the Parliament of the United Kingdom disestablished in 2010
Politics of the Borough of Basildon
Billericay